Belluru Mylaraiah Srikantaiah (3 January 1884 – 5 January 1946), was an Indian author, writer and translator of Kannada literature.

Prominent Students
 V. Seetharamaiah
 K. V. Puttappa

Works 
 Gadayuddha Natakam (ಗದಾಯುದ್ಧ ನಾಟಕಂ) (play)
 Aswatthaaman ( ಅಶ್ವತ್ಥಾಮನ್ ) (Play)
 Honganasugalu ( ಹೊಂಗನಸುಗಳು ) (Poetry)

Translations 
 English Geetegalu (ಇಂಗ್ಲೀಷ್ ಗೀತೆಗಳು )(English Songs, 1921)
" lead kindly light"
 Kural (1940, Bangalore)
 Silappatikaram

Literary criticism 
 Kannadigarige olleya saahitya (Good literature for Kannada People)
 Kannada Kaipidi (History of Kannada Literature)

See also 
 Kannada language
 Kannada literature
 Kannada poetry

References

1884 births
1946 deaths
Kannada-language writers
People from Tumkur district
Kannada people
Academic staff of the University of Mysore
20th-century Indian poets
Writers from Karnataka
Tamil–Kannada translators
Translators of the Tirukkural into Kannada
20th-century Indian male writers
20th-century translators
Tirukkural translators
Writers in British India